The Popular Front for Recovery (FPR) was a militia from Chad. It destabilized northern Central African Republic from 2008 to 2012.

The leader of the FPR was General Abdel Kader Baba-Laddé.

History 
The FPR has signed ceasefires on several occasions, only to return to fighting soon after, in a cycle that is typical of conflicts in the region. In January 2014 FPR took control of Bang, town on border with Chad and Cameroon, however they were ousted by Revolution and Justice month later. On 8 December 2014 group leader, Baba-Laddé was arrested near Kabo

Citations

References

Factions of the Central African Republic Civil War
Rebel groups in Chad
Rebel groups in the Central African Republic